Sarpsborg Papp AS was a Norwegian industrial company, which ran a packaging plant in Sarpsborg, Norway.

Founded in 1914 as Sarpsborg Emballagefabrik, it was the first corrugated paper factory in Norway. In 1961 the company was acquired by M. Peterson & Søn. It was M. Peterson & Søn's first acquirement in the field of packaging.

The Peterson name having been introduced in all sub-companies in 1992, the production unit at Sarpsborg is now named Peterson Emballasje AS, Sarpsborg, organized within the branch Peterson Packaging.

References

Manufacturing companies disestablished in 1961
Pulp and paper companies of Norway
Companies based in Østfold
Defunct pulp and paper companies
Pulp and paper mills in Norway
1914 establishments in Norway
Manufacturing companies established in 1914
1961 disestablishments in Norway